Aleksandr Penigin (born 2 February 1974) is a Belarusian freestyle skier. He competed in the men's moguls event at the 1994 Winter Olympics.

References

1974 births
Living people
Belarusian male freestyle skiers
Olympic freestyle skiers of Belarus
Freestyle skiers at the 1994 Winter Olympics
Sportspeople from Minsk